Piekary Śląskie is a city in Silesia in southern Poland, near Katowice. The north district of the Upper Silesian Metropolitan Union – metropolis with the population of 2 million. Located in the Silesian Highlands, on the Brynica river (tributary of the Vistula).

It is situated in the Silesian Voivodeship since its formation in 1999, previously in Katowice Voivodeship, and before then, of the Autonomous Silesian Voivodeship. Piekary Śląskie is one of the cities of the 2.7 million conurbation – Katowice urban area and within a greater Silesian metropolitan area populated by about 5,294,000 people. The population of the city is 54,226 (2021).

Piekary is a spiritual center of Upper Silesia, a Marian shrine which is a pilgrimage site for thousands of the faithful, and a mining town.

History

Piekary Śląskie was created in 1934 in interwar Poland by merging the communes of Szarlej and Wielkie Piekary into Szarlej-Wielkie Piekary. In 1935 it was renamed Piekary Śląskie.

Name and early history
There are two legends about the founding of Piekary, according to one it was founded in the late 10th century, and according to the other it was founded by Polish ruler Casimir I the Restorer in 1041. The area formed part of Poland after the establishment of the state in the 10th century. Under the Latinized name of Pecare, the settlement was mentioned in a document by the bishop of Kraków Paweł of Przemankowo from 1277. The name is of Polish origin. It derives from the word piekarz (meaning "baker"), referring to possible bakers baking bread here for the nearby city of Bytom or from the word pieczara (meaning "cavern"), as caverns were supposedly created here as a result of exploitation of ore.

As a result of the 12th-century fragmentation of Poland it was part of various Piast-ruled duchies, the last being the Duchy of Opole until 1526. Between 1303 and 1318, the first church and independent parish were created there. In the 15th century, the zinc and lead mining industry developed and the process of settlement evolution begun.

Modern era
In 1526 Piekary came under the suzerainty of the Habsburg monarchy. Polish King John III Sobieski visited Piekary in 1683, while rushing to the relief of Vienna during the Ottoman invasion. The next years brought several peasant revolts against the German magnates. In 1697, newly elected King of Poland Augustus II the Strong stopped in Piekary before his royal coronation in Kraków. He converted to Catholicism in the local church and at the same time he sworn the pacta conventa. In January 1734, his son, elected king Augustus III of Poland, also stopped here, while heading for his royal coronation, and also swore the pacta conventa here.

In 1742 the settlement was annexed by Prussia and colonisation and Germanisation of Piekary Śląskie increased. The result was a strong movement towards maintaining the Polish origins of the land. In 1842, Piekary's rector, priest Jan Alojzy Ficek, commissioned a new neo-romanesque Basilica of St. Mary and St. Bartholomew designed by Daniel Grötschel. A painting of the Virgin Mary was placed there. In the mid-19th century,  founded a Polish printing house. In the late 19th century Polish singing and gymnastic societies, reading rooms and the first patriotic organizations were established. In 1905 the Polish Gymnastic Society "Sokół" was established in Piekary. Tram communication was available from 1894.

Recent history

It was one of the centers of Silesian Uprisings and in 1922 was ceded to the Second Polish Republic by Weimar Germany as 86% of the population voted for joining the re-established Polish state. In June 1922, a symbolic ceremony of reintegration of Piekary with Poland took place. On July 10, 1939, Piekary Śląskie received city rights with effect from 1940. As a result of the outbreak of World War II, the actual implementation of this law did not take place until 1947.

During the joint German-Soviet invasion of Poland, which started World War II, Piekary was captured by Germany in September 1939, and then was under German occupation until 1945. Already in September 1939, the Germans carried out several executions of Poles (see Nazi crimes against the Polish nation). On September 6, Germans murdered three Poles in the present-day district of Brzozowice. On September 17, the Freikorps murdered two miners, one local official and one former Silesian Uprisings participant in Piekary. Several miners from the present-day district of Brzozowice were murdered in nearby Lasowice (present-day district of Tarnowskie Góry). Local teachers were among Polish teachers murdered in Nazi concentration camps. The Polenlager No. 188, a forced labour camp for Poles, was operated in the city. During the occupation, the city's main street, Bytomska, was renamed Adolf Hitler Street (Adolf-Hitler-Straße).

In 1973 Kozłowa Góra was included within the city limits as the northernmost district. Under the administrative reform of 1975, the city limits were expanded by including the surrounding towns and settlements: Dąbrówka Wielka, Brzeziny Śląskie, Brzozowice and Kamień.

Districts

Sights

The main landmark of Piekary Śląskie is the Romanesque Revival Basilica of St. Mary and St. Bartholomew, a popular Catholic pilgrimage site. It is the highest point within the city limits. Also the Piekary Calvary with the Church of the Resurrection of Christ is one of the city's landmarks.

Other historic architecture includes the Sacred Heart church, Saints Peter and Paul church, Our Lady Help of Christians church and the Our Lady of Perpetual Help chapel in Kozłowa Góra, as well as numerous historic townhouses and buildings. In the city there are also monuments commemorating Poles murdered during the German occupation in World War II, and a monument to local Polish independence activist and poet Wawrzyniec Hajda, located in the Szarlej district.

Gallery

Sports
The city's most notable sports club is handball team Olimpia Piekary Śląskie, which competes in the I Liga (Polish second tier), but in the past played in the Polish Superliga (top division), where it finished 4th in 2007.

Notable people

 Karol Langner (1843–1912), Polish priest
  (1844–1923), Polish independence activist and poet
 Hans Marchwitza, born at Szarlej (1890–1965), German writer and Communist
 Hans Kroll (1898–1967), German diplomat
 Wilhelm Antoni Góra (1916–1975), Polish footballer
 Marek Siwiec (born 1955), Polish politician, Member of the European Parliament
 Jerzy Polaczek (born 1961), Polish politician
 Adam Matysek (born 1968), Polish footballer
 Dariusz Wosz (born 1969), German footballer

Twin towns – sister cities

Piekary Śląskie is twinned with:
 Kobuleti, Georgia
 Kroměříž, Czech Republic
 Marija Bistrica, Croatia

References

External links
 Piekary, Silesia
 Jewish Community in Piekary Śląskie on Virtual Shtetl

 
City counties of Poland
Cities and towns in Silesian Voivodeship
Silesian Voivodeship (1920–1939)